
Gmina Zadzim is a rural gmina (administrative district) in Poddębice County, Łódź Voivodeship, in central Poland.

Villages
Gmina Zadzim contains the villages and settlements of Adamka, Alfonsów, Annów, Anusin, Babiniec, Bąki, Bogucice, Bratków Dolny, Bratków Górny, Budy Jeżewskie, Charchów Księży, Charchów Pański, Chodaki, Dąbrówka, Dąbrówka D, Dzierzązna Szlachecka, Głogowiec, Górki Zadzimskie, Grabina, Grabinka, Hilarów, Iwonie, Jeżew, Jeżew PGR, Józefów, Kazimierzew, Kłoniszew, Kolonia Chodaki, Kolonia Grabinka, Kolonia Piła, Kolonia Rudunki, Kolonia Rzeczyca, Kraszyn, Leszkomin, Maksymilianów, Małyń, Marcinów, Nowy Świat, Otok, Otok PKP, Pałki, Pietrachy, Piła, Piotrów, Ralewice, Ruda Jeżewska, Rudunki, Rzechta Drużbińska, Rzeczyca, Sikory, Skęczno, Szczawno Rzeczyckie, Urszulin, Walentynów, Wierzchy, Wiorzyska, Wola Dąbska, Wola Flaszczyna, Wola Sipińska, Wola Zaleska, Wyrębów, Zaborów, Zadzim, Zalesie, Zalesie PGR, Zawady, Żerniki and Zygry.

Neighbouring gminas
Gmina Zadzim is bordered by the gminas of Lutomiersk, Pęczniew, Poddębice, Szadek, Warta and Wodzierady.

References
 Polish official population figures 2006

Zadzim
Poddębice County